The large moth family Crambidae contains the following genera beginning with "O":

References 

 O
Crambid